Attic Thoughts is a 1975 instrumental progressive rock album by Swedish musician Bo Hansson.

Recording and release
The album was recorded during 1974 and 1975 at Studio Decibel in Stockholm, and at Hansson's home, which had virtually become a studio by this point in his career.  The album featured contributions from many of the same session musicians and friends that had played on Hansson's previous album, Magician's Hat.  In addition to featuring Hansson's usual blend of other-worldly progressive rock and fairy tale-like ambiance, Attic Thoughts includes a suite named "Rabbit Music", which was inspired by Richard Adams' novel Watership Down, a subject which Hansson would explore further on his 1977 album Music Inspired by Watership Down.

In Hansson's native Sweden, Attic Thoughts was released with the Swedish title of Mellanväsen. It was released with its English title in April 1975 by Charisma Records, but was less commercially successful than Hansson's preceding solo albums and failed to reach the charts in the UK or the United States.

Track listing
All tracks composed by Bo Hansson except where indicated.

Side 1
"Attic Thoughts: a) March b) Repose c) Wandering" – 5:33
"Time and Space" – 1:39
"Waiting..." (Bo Hansson, Kenny Håkansson) – 7:34
"Waltz for Interbeings" – 3:26

Side 2
"Time for Great Achievements" – 3:11
"The Hybrills" – 1:24
"Rabbit Music: a) General Woundwort b) Fiver" – 6:30
"Day and Night" – 4:33
"A Happy Prank" – 3:17

2004 CD reissue bonus track
 "The Crystal Suite: a) Crystals b) Memories of Darkness c) Light Again" – 6:21

Personnel 
 Bo Hansson – organs, guitars, bass guitar, synthesizer, mellotron, special effects
 Rune Carlsson – drums
 Kenny Håkansson – electric guitar
 Jöran Lagerberg – bass guitar, acoustic guitar
 Gunnar Bergsten – saxophone
 Rolf Scherrer – acoustic guitar
 Tomas Netzler – bass guitar
 Mats Glenngård – violin
 Anders Oredsson – mixing on "Waiting..."
 Jan Ternald – cover painting
 Barry Lester and Company – artwork

Releases
 CD	Attic Thoughts One Way Records	 1996
 CD	Attic Thoughts EMI Music Distribution	 2004
 CD	Attic Thoughts Virgin	 2004
 CD	Attic Thoughts [Bonus Track] EMI Music Distribution	 2005

References

1975 albums
Bo Hansson albums
Charisma Records albums
Instrumental rock albums